is a Japanese professional boxer. He is a two-weight world champion, having held the IBF mini-flyweight title from 2017 to 2018, and the WBA (Super) and The Ring light-flyweight titles from 2018 to 2022. As of October 2022, he is ranked as the world's best active light flyweight by ESPN, second by the Transnational Boxing Rankings Board and third by BoxRec.

Professional career

Early career
Kyoguchi made his professional debut against Narathip Sungsut on April 17, 2016. He won the fight by a second-round knockout. This victory was followed by four consecutive stoppage victories, during which he defeated Taweechai Yuyuet by a first-round technical knockout, Kenichi Miyazaki by a third-round technical knockout, Michael Camelion by a 33 second knockout and Junuel Lacar by a third-round knockout.

He was scheduled to fight Armando de la Cruz for the OPBF minimumweight title in his sixth fight, on February 28, 2017. He won the fight by a third-round knockout. Kyoguchi was scheduled to defend his OPBF minimum against Jonathan Refugio, on April 25, 2017. He beat Refugio by unanimous decision, with the judges scoring the bout 117-111, 118-111 and 119-109 in Kyoguchi's favor.

IBF mini-flyweight champion

Kyoguchi vs. Argumedo
Kyoguchi was scheduled to fight the reigning IBF mini-flyweight champion Jose Argumedo in the latter's fourth title defense, on July 23, 2017. Due to his lack of professional experience and world title fight, Kyoguchi came into the fight as the betting underdog to the more accomplished Argumedo. The fight itself was a messy affair, with a lot of clinching and slipping to the mat. Kyoguchi scored the only knockdown of the fight in the ninth round, dropping Argumedo with a left. He won the fight by unanimous decision, with two of the judges scoring the fight 116-111 in his favor, while the third judge scored it 115-112 for Kyoguchi. He became the Japanese boxer to win a world title in the shortest amount of time, at 1 year and 3 months.

Kyoguchi vs. Buitrago
Kyoguchi was scheduled to make his first IBF mini-flyweight title defense against the former WBO and IBF mini flyweight champion Carlos Buitrago, on December 31, 2017. The fight was scheduled as the co-main event to the Ryoichi Taguchi and Milan Melindo fight. Kyoguchi established distance early on with the jab, and began accumulating damage on his opponent with a combination of body-head power shots. Kyoguchi won the fight by an eight-round technical knockout, which was the first stoppage loss in Buitrago's professional career. During the post-fight press conference, Kyoguchi stated his desire to fight either Hekkie Budler or Kenshiro Teraji.

Kyoguchi vs. Paras
Kyoguchi was scheduled to make his second IBF mini-flyweight title defense against the #15 IBF light flyweight contender Vince Paras, on May 20, 2018. It was the second consecutive time he fought on the Ryoichi Taguchi undercard, as Taguchi took on Hekkie Budler. Kyoguchi handed Paras his first professional loss, as he won the fight by a wide unanimous decision, with all three judges scoring the fight 117-110 for Kyoguchi.

On July 27, 2018, Kyoguchi stated he would vacate his IBF title, as he was no longer confident of successful cutting down to mini-flyweight. He officially vacated the title on August 11, 2018.

WBA and The Ring light-flyweight champion

Kyoguchi vs. Budler
Kyoguchi was scheduled to challenge the reigning WBA (Super) and The Ring light-flyweight champion Hekkie Budler on December 31, 2018. The fight was on the undercard of the Donnie Nietes and Kazuto Ioka main event, and was Kyoguchi's second fight outside of Japan. Kyoguchi came into the fight as a favorite over Budler.

The two fighters were on an even playing field for the first half of the fight, before Kyoguchi took over in the seventh and began landing more frequent power shots to the head and body. Budler appeared to have issues with his cardio and breathing. Kyoguchi won the fight by technical knockout in the tenth round, after Budler retired from the bout, and was ahead on the official scorecards when the fight was stopped. Budler later confirmed that he was having sinus issues going into the fight.

Kyoguchi vs. Satanmuanglek
Kyoguchi was scheduled to make his first title defenses against the reigning World Boxing Council Asian Boxing champion Satanmuanglek CP Freshmart, on June 19, 2019, on the Kazuto Ioka versus Aston Palicte undercard. Although Satanmuanglek had fought for world titles in muay thai, having held the Lumpinee Stadium title in two weight classes, this was his first boxing world title fight. During the pre-fight press conference, Kyoguchi stated his desire to fight his fellow countryman Kenshiro Teraji in a light flyweight title unification bout. Kyoguchi defeated Satanmuanglek by unanimous decision, with two of the judges scoring the fight 117-111 in his favor, while the third judge scored the bout 117-112 for Kyoguchi.

Kyoguchi vs. Hisada
Kyoguchi was scheduled to make the second defense of his WBA (Super) and The Ring light-flyweight titles against Tetsuya Hisada, on October 1, 2019. This was Hisada's first world title challenge in 46 professional fights, and Kyoguchi entered the fight as a significant betting favorite. Kyoguchi remained in control for the duration of the bout, managing to score a knockdown in the ninth round, but being unable to finish Hisada. Kyoguchi won by unanimous decision, with scores of 115-112, 116-111 and 117-110.

Kyoguch was scheduled to make his third WBA title defense against Thanongsak Simsri on November 3, 2020. Simsri was at the time the 11th-ranked contender in the WBA light flyweight rankings. On November 2, 2020, one day before the fight, Kyoguchi announced he was unable to fight, as both he and his coaches had contracted COVID-19.

Kyoguchi vs. Vega
Kyoguchi was scheduled to defend his WBA (Super) and The Ring light-flyweight titles against Axel Aragon Vega, on March 13, 2021, on the undercard of the Juan Francisco Estrada and Román González card. As this was his United States debut, Kyoguchi signed a multi-fight deal Matchroom Boxing, who would be responsible for promoting Kyoguchi’s overseas fights. This was Kyoguchi's first fight after a year and a half of inactivity, having pulled out of a scheduled match with Thanongsak Simsri on November 2, 2020, after Kyoguchi and his corner contracted COVID-19. Kyoguchi came into the bout as a significant betting favorite.

Kyoguchi failed to make use of his 7 inch height and 6 inch reach advantage, spending the duration of the bout trading power shots in either the clinch or the pocket with his shorter opponent. Many boxing experts expected a different strategy from the champion. The fight ended after the fifth round, as Vega retired from the fight due to a hand injury. He had injured his hand in the earlier rounds, but an overhead right hand in the fifth aggravated the injury, forcing Vega to withdraw.

Kyoguchi vs. Bermudez
On June 10, 2021, Kyoguchi was ordered by the WBA to face the WBA Regular champion Esteban Bermudez in a unification match. However, on September 16, DAZN announced that Bermudez would make a voluntary title defense against the unbeaten Jesse “Bam” Rodriguez. The WBA later confirmed that Bermudez was still tied to ordered title fight with Kyoguchi and hadn't approved his fight with Rodriguez. On October 21, 2021, the WBA gave them an additional ten day to come to terms regarding the fight, and furthermore stated: "If there is no agreement or if any of the parties express unwillingness to agree on the fight, [a purse bid] will be called.” The two camps finally came to terms for a title consolidation bout on November 12, 2021. On December 9, 2021, it was revealed that the fight would take place on January 15, 2022, in Mexico, at a venue that would be announced at a later date. On December 29, 2021, the WBA gave fight promoter Matchroom Boxing a ten-day period to deliver proof of firm plans that the title consolidation bout would take place. The WBA scheduled a purse bid for January 22, 2022, after Matchroom failed to provide sufficient proof that a bout would take place. On January 27, 2022, the WBA allowed Bermudez to make a voluntary title defense against Carlos Cañizales, as Kyoguchi withdrew from the scheduled purse bid due to an injury. The bout didn't take place however, as Cañizales opted to face Ganigan López for the vacant WBA Continental Americans flyweight title instead.

The title bout with Bermudez was rescheduled for June 10, 2022, as the main event of a DAZN broadcast card which will take place in Mexico City, Mexico. The venue was later changed to the Domo Alcalde in Guadalajara, Mexico, as Kyogochi's team was concerned with how the higher elevation of Mexico City might affect him. Kyoguchi retained the title by a technical knockout, halting Bermudez with a flurry of punches at the 0:24 minute mark of the eight round. He was leading on two of the judges' scorecards at the time of the stoppage, with scores of 66–65, while the third judge had Bermudez up 66–65. Kyoguchi knocked Bermudez down in the seventh round, but was deducted a point in the sixth and seventh round, for headbutting and rabbit punching respectively. Bermudez was examined by the ringside physician at the end of the second and seventh rounds, due to a cut above his left eyelid which he suffered early in the second round.

Kyoguchi vs. Teraji
Kyoguchi faced the two-time WBC light flyweight champion Kenshiro Teraji in a title unification match on November 1, 2022. It was just the second-ever unification bout between reigning titlists from Japan, while the winner of the bout was expected to become the first recognized lineal champion in more than a decade, since Giovani Segura vacated his title in 2011. Kyoguchi lost the fight by a seventh-round technical knockout. He was knocked down by a right cross in the fifth round, before the referee stopped the bout in the seventh round, as he judged Kyoguchi to have suffered too much damage.

Professional boxing record

See also
List of mini-flyweight boxing champions
List of light-flyweight boxing champions
List of Japanese boxing world champions

References

External links

Hiroto Kyoguchi - Profile, News Archive & Current Rankings at Box.Live

1993 births
Living people
People from Izumi, Osaka
Mini-flyweight boxers
Light-flyweight boxers
World mini-flyweight boxing champions
World light-flyweight boxing champions
International Boxing Federation champions
World Boxing Association champions
The Ring (magazine) champions
Japanese male boxers